Awngthim is an extinct Australian Aboriginal language formerly spoken in Cape York in Queensland, Australia by the Winduwinda people. The Awngthim language region includes the areas around Weipa and the Cook Shire.

Name
The name Awngthim is not a synonym of Anguthimri, though due to their similarity they have sometimes been confused.

Dialects
Hale (1964) treats Awngthim as a cover term for dialects Ntrwa'ngayth , Thyanhngayth , and Mamngayth .  -Ngayth is a suffix common to many tribal names of the area. These are the Ntrwa'a, Thyanh, and Mam dialects.

The Ndrangith and Ndra'ngith languages have been confused with Ntrwa'ngayth.

Phonology

Consonant Phonemes

Vowel Phonemes

See also
Ndra'ngith language, identified in Donohue (1991) as being the same as the Ntrwa'ngayth dialect, but seen as distinct by Sutton (2001)

References

Northern Paman languages
Extinct languages of Queensland